Karl Müller (born 1952 in Roggwil TG) is a Swiss engineer and businessman.  He is the creator of the Masai Barefoot Technology brand of rocker bottom shoes, and holds a patent on his design. Müller founded Swiss Masai (now known as Masai Marketing and Trading AG) in 1996 to market his new shoe concept. In 2007, he left the company on amicable terms and went on to found kybun Corporation to market a newer "walk-on-air" shoe concept.

Products sold by Kybun include shoe models that have a shock-absorbing, adaptive air cushion integrated into the shoe. Kybun further sells an elastic mat, as well as a treadmill that is made with a soft, springy material.

References

External links 
The Science of Running Barefoot – in Shoes, The Wall Street Journal, September 13, 2005
Cloaking Cellulite, Time Magazine, July 4, 2004
Karl Müller im Interview, Cash TV Schweizer Fernsehen 2, 22. März 2009
MBT-Erfinder verkauft sein Geschäft, Schweizer Fernsehen, 13. Oktober 2006
Der Schuhmacher aus Roggwil, Frankfurter Allgemeine Zeitung, 10. September 2005
Karl Müller und MBT, Bilanz das Schweizer Wirtschaftsmagazin, 28. Juni 2005
Patent of Karl Müller's invention, July 3, 1998

Living people
20th-century Swiss inventors
Swiss engineers
1952 births
Swiss businesspeople
Swiss expatriates in South Korea
21st-century Swiss inventors